Kim Won-hong (born 17 July 1945) is a North Korean politician and military general.

Early life and education
Kim was born in what is now North Korea's North Hwanghae Province. He graduated from the Workers' Party of Korea's Kim Il-sung Higher Party School and has been serving in the Korean People's Army since 1962, holding several positions in the army's General Political Bureau as well as commander of army corps. His first public mention was as a funeral committee member for late Marshal Choe Kwang in 1997. He was elected deputy to the Supreme People's Assembly in 1998.

Career
Kim Won-hong rose to prominence in 2003, as he was appointed commander of the Military Security Command (the North Korean army's intelligence unit) following the death of General Won Ung-hui, who had been heading it since 1990. In April 2009, Kim was promoted to General and then migrated to the KPA General Political Bureau's Department, at the same time when Kim Jong-il reportedly put Kim Jong-un in charge of the Ministry of State Security to which the Military Security Command is affiliated. Kim was also made a member of the Party's Central Committee and Central Military Commission in September 2010 and was reported to having a role in ensuring Kim Jong-un's succession.

After Kim Jong-il's death and acting head of State Security Department, U Tong-chuk's purge, Kim Won-hong appeared as one of Kim Jong-un's most trusted and supporting generals. He was made a Politburo member as well as the first minister of State Security in 25 years in April 2012. He was also elected member of the National Defence Commission. The South Korean government reported in February 2017 that Kim Won-hong was fired in mid-January after he was demoted to a one-star general from a four-star one on charges of corruption and abuse of power. He then disappeared from public view, but resurfaced in April 2017 for Day of the Sun celebrations, bearing the four-star insignia on his uniform.

In late November 2017, Kim Won-hong was named as one of two North Korean officials punished for "impure behavior." According to South Korean Rep. Kim Byunk-kee, Kim Won Hong, identified as deputy director of North Korea's General Political Bureau (GPB), was reportedly punished along with the director of that bureau, identified as Hwang Pyong So. The form of punishment was unspecified.

Despite being punished he did appear at an April 2017 parade, though when Kim Jong-Un walked by it appeared he was ignored possibly indicating he had lost some favor with him. In May 2017, he was appointed to Deputy Director of the KPA General Political Department. In September he was under investigation again and removed from the position with the WPK Organization and Guidance Department. During April and May 2018, he lost his positions as WPK Political Bureau, WPK Central Military Commission and the State Affairs Commission.¸

Awards and honors
The official portrait of Won illustrates Won wearing all the decorations awarded to him.

 Order of Kim Il-sung

 Order of Kim Jong-il

 Order of the National Flag First Class, eight times

 Order of Freedom and Independence First Class

 Order of Korean Labour

 Commemorative Order "Foundation of the Democratic People's Republic of Korea"

 Commemorative Order "50th Anniversary of the Foundation of the Democratic People's Republic of Korea"

 Commemorative Order "Anniversary of the Foundation of the People's Army"

 Order of Military Service Honour First Class

 Commemorative Order "30th Anniversary of the Agricultural Presentation"

 Order of the National Flag Second Class, three times

 Order of Military Service Honour Second Class

 Order of the Red Banner of Three Great Revolutions, twice

 Order of the National Flag Third Class, three times

 Order of Military Service Honour Third Class

 Commemorative Medal "The Foundation of the People's Republic of Korea"

 Medal For Military Merit, three times

 Commemorative Medal "Military Parade"

References

|-

|-

North Korean military personnel
1945 births
Living people
Members of the Supreme People's Assembly
People from North Hwanghae
Members of the 6th Politburo of the Workers' Party of Korea
Members of the 7th Politburo of the Workers' Party of Korea
Members of the 6th Central Committee of the Workers' Party of Korea
Members of the 7th Central Committee of the Workers' Party of Korea